Sandra Cristina Marzullo Pêra (born September 17, 1954) is a Brazilian actress, singer and theater director.

Family 
She is daughter of the actors Manuel Pêra and Dinorah Marzullo and granddaughter of the actress Antonia Marzullo. She is mother of the singer Amora Pêra, who is daughter of the composer and singer Gonzaguinha. Sandra is sister of the actress Marília Pêra.

Career 
She started the career in 1975 in the nightclub Dancin' Days, when Nelson Motta formed a group of waitresses-singers, that afterwards would turn to be called As Frenéticas.

She directed the show Baiana da Gema, of the singer Simone.

Television 
 2013  Chiquititas .... Valentina

 2011 Show do Tom .... Bruna Cachacinha's mother
 2010 Passione .... Madame Kiti
 2008 Chamas da Vida .... Mercedes
 2008 Malhação .... Mafalda
 2008 Sete Pecados .... wardress
 2002 Desejos de Mulher .... Geralda
 2001 Porto dos Milagres .... reporter
 1997 Mandacaru .... baiana
 1996 O Campeão 1992 Escolinha do Professor Raimundo .... Dinorá (the gossiper)
 1978 Dancin' Days .... herself
 1972 Uma Rosa com Amor.... Sílvia

 Cinema 
Cinema credits:
 2008 Embarque Imediato .... Betina
 1989 Dias Melhores Virão .... Tânia
 1987 Agonia 1978 O Bom Marido''

References

External links

1954 births
Living people
Actresses from Rio de Janeiro (city)
Brazilian people of Portuguese descent
Brazilian people of Italian descent
Brazilian television actresses
Brazilian film actresses
Brazilian theatre directors
Brazilian telenovela actresses
20th-century Brazilian actresses
21st-century Brazilian actresses
20th-century Brazilian women singers
20th-century Brazilian singers
21st-century Brazilian women singers
21st-century Brazilian singers